Eliška Jalovcová (born 26 July 1989) is a Czech curler.

Teams

Women's

Mixed

Personal life
She started curling in 2002.

References

External links

Jalovcová Eliška (CC LEDOBORCI - Icebreakers) - Player statistics (all games with his/her participation) - Czech Curling Association 

Living people
1989 births
Czech female curlers
Czech curling champions
Competitors at the 2011 Winter Universiade
Place of birth missing (living people)